The list of French modern frigates covers ships acquired or built between 1925 and the present day. This list is not comprehensive. In France, "destroyers" are called "contre-torpilleurs" or "first rank frigates"; hence, destroyer-size ships might be listed here. During the 1940s, frigate-size ships were called "torpilleurs".

Orage (1926)
  (1927)
Simoun (1926)
Tramontane (1927)
Trombe (1927)
Bourrasque (1926)
Cyclone (1927)
Mistral (1927)
Siroco (1927)
Tempête (1926)
Typhon (1928)
Tornade (1928)

Mars (1926)
Le Fortuné (1926)
Palme (1926)
La Railleuse (1926)
Alcyon (1926)
L'Adroit (1927)
Boulonnais (1928)
Brestois (1928)
Bordelais (1930)
Basque (1930)
Forbin (1930)
Fougueux (1930)
  (1931)
Frondeur (1931)

Albatros (F762, 1931)

Hardi (1938)
Fleuret (1938)
L'Adroit (ex-Épée) (1938)
Mameluck (1939)
Casque (1938)
Lansquenet (1939)
Siroco (ex-Corsaire) (1939)
Bison (ex-Flibustier) (1939)

La Melpomène (1936)
La Flore (1936)
La Pomone (1936)
L'Iphigénie (1936)
La Bayonnaise (1938)
La Cordelière (1938)
L'Incomprise (1938)
La Pousuivante (1937)
Bombarde (1937)
Branlebas (1938)
Bouclier (1938)
Baliste (1938)

La Grandière (ex-Ville d'Ys) (F731, 1940)
Dumont d'Urville (F732, 1932)
Savorgnan de Brazza (F733, 1933)
  
Annamite (F734, 1940)
Chevreuil (F735, 1939)
Gazelle (F736, 1939)
Bisson (F737, 1947)
Cdt Amyot d'Inville (F738, 1947)
Cdt de Pimodan (F739, 1947)
 
Cdt Bory (F740, 1939)
Cdt Delage (F741, 1939)
Cdt Domine (F742, 1940)
Cdt Duboc (F743, 1939)
La Boudeuse (F744, 1940)
La Capricieuse (F745, 1940)
La Gracieuse (F746, 1940)
La Moqueuse (F747, 1940)
Elan (F748, 1939)
  (1943)
Alsacien (1942)
Lorrain (1943)
 
 (F701, 1943)
Sénégalais (F702, 1943)
Somali (F703, 1944)
Hova (F704, 1944)
Marocain (F705, 1944)
Tunisien (F706, 1943)
 River class
Croix de Lorraine (F710, 1943)
L'Aventure (F707, 1944)
L'Escarmouche (F709, 1944)
La Découverte (F712, 1943)
La Surprise (F708, 1944)
Tonkinois (F711, 1943)
 
  (1947)
  (1947)
  (1947)
  (1947)
Francis Garnier (F730, 1948)
 
  (1950)
  (1950)
  (1950)
  (1950)
  (1950)
  (1950)
  (1952)
  (1952)
 Le Corse class
Le Corse (F761, 1955)
Le Brestois (F762, 1956)
Le Boulonnais (F763, 1956)
Le Bordelais (F764, 1955)
Le Normand class
Le Normand (F765, 1956)
Le Picard (F766, 1956)
Le Gascon (F767, 1957)
Le Lorrain (F768, 1957)
Le Bourguignon (F769, 1957)
Le Champenois (F770, 1957)
Le Savoyard (F771, 1957)
Le Breton (F772, 1957)
Le Basque (F773, 1957)
L'Agenais (F774, 1958)
Le Béarnais (F775, 1958)
L'Alsacien (F776, 1960)
Le Provencal (F777, 1959)
Le Vendéen (F778, 1960)
Commandant Rivière class
Victor Schoelcher (F725, 1962)
Commandant Bory (F726, 1964)
Doudart de Lagrée (F728, 1963)
Balny (F729, 1966)
Commandant Rivière (F733, 1962)
Commandant Bourdais (F740, 1963)
Protet (F748, 1964)
Enseigne de vaisseau Henry (F749, 1965)
L'Ardent (P635, 1958)
L'Intrepide (P636, 1958)
L'Étourdi (P637, 1958)
L'Effronté (P638, 1959)
Le Frondeur (P639, 1959)
Le Fringant (P640, 1959)
L'opiniâtre (P644, 1954)
Le Fougueux (P641, 1954)
L'Agile (P642, 1954)
L'Adroit (P643, 1957)
L'Alerte (P645, 1957)
L'Attentif (P646, 1957)
L'Enjoue (P647, 1957)
Le Hardi (P648, 1958)
Amiral Mouchez (F752, 1937)
Paul Goffeny (F754, 1948)
Cdt Robert Giraud (F755, 1947)
 
D'Estienne d'Orves (F781, 1976)
Amyot d'Inville (F782, 1976)
Drogou (F783, 1976)
Detroyat (F784, 1977)
Jean Moulin (F785, 1977)
Quartier-Maître Anquetil (F786, 1977)
Commandant de Pimodan (F787, 1978)
Second-Maitre Le Bihan (F788, 1978)
Lieutenant de vaisseau Le Henaff (F789, 1979)
Lieutenant de vaisseau Lavallée (F790, 1980)
Premier-maître l'Her (F792, 1981)

See also 
 List of French sail frigates
 List of French steam frigates
 List of French current frigates

Sources and references 
 Conway : Conway's All the World's Fighting Ships 1922–1946 (1980)  
 Whitley, MH : Destroyers of World War Two (1988) 
  Bâtiments désarmés on NetMarine.net

Frigate
Lists of frigates